Akhtar Hamid Siddiqui (1947 – 19 November 2017) was a Bangladesh Nationalist Party politician who served as the Deputy Speaker of the 8th Jatiya Sangsad. He was elected to the parliament from the Naogaon-3 constituency in four consecutive elections from 1991 to 2001. He was also appointed as an Advisor to BNP Chairperson in 2016.

References

1947 births
2017 deaths
People from Naogaon District
University of Dhaka alumni
Bangladesh Nationalist Party politicians
Deputy Speakers of the Jatiya Sangsad
5th Jatiya Sangsad members
6th Jatiya Sangsad members
7th Jatiya Sangsad members
8th Jatiya Sangsad members